Serkay Tütüncü (born 7 February 1991) is a Turkish actor.

Life and career 
Serkay Tütüncü was born on 7 February 1991 in Tire, İzmir. His family is of Albanian descent. His father was football player. Serkay Tütüncü is a gradue of Ege University and played soccer in İzmirspor, Balçovaspor, İzmir Police and Alaçatıspor teams in his youth. 

In 2016, he took part in Survivor 2016 on TV8, and finished the competition as the runner-up. He started acting afterwards. In 2018, he made his television debut with the series İnsanlık Suçu. Between 2019 and 2020, he had a recurring role as Volkan on Kanal D's romantic comedy series Afili Aşk. He also had a supporting role on FOX's Bay Yanlış before being cast in a leading role in Masumiyet. In February 2022, he appeared as Alaz in the series Hayaller ve Hayatlar, which is broadcast on the beIN CONNECT digital platform in Turkey.

Filmography

References

External links 
 
 

1991 births
Living people
Ege University alumni
Turkish male television actors